Capraita is a genus of flea beetles in the family Chrysomelidae. There are some 60 described species in the Nearctic and Neotropics.

Selected species

 Capraita carinimera
 Capraita circumdata (Randall, 1838)
 Capraita cuyaba Bechyné, 1957
 Capraita durangoensis (Jacoby, 1892)
 Capraita encarpalis
 Capraita flavida (Horn, 1889)
 Capraita indigoptera (J. L. LeConte, 1878)
 Capraita nigrosignata (Schaeffer, 1920) (germander flea beetle)
 Capraita obsidiana (Fabricius, 1801)
 Capraita pervittata (Blake, 1927)
 Capraita punzonensis
 Capraita quercata (Fabricius, 1801)
 Capraita saltatra (Blatchley, 1923)
 Capraita scalaris (F. E. Melsheimer, 1847)
 Capraita sexmaculata (Illiger, 1807) (Charlie Brown flea beetle)
 Capraita spilonota (Blake, 1927)
 Capraita stichocephala
 Capraita sublaevis
 Capraita subvittata (Horn, 1889)
 Capraita suturalis (Fabricius, 1801)
 Capraita texana (Crotch, 1873)
 Capraita thelma
 Capraita thyamoides (Crotch, 1873)
 Capraita virkkii

References

External links

 

Alticini
Chrysomelidae genera
Articles created by Qbugbot